Battle of Narva may refer to:
Siege of Narva (1558), a battle between Livonia and Russia, part of the Livonian War
Battle of Narva (1581), a battle between Sweden and Russia, part of the Livonian War
Battle of Narva (1700), a battle between Sweden and Russia, part of the Great Northern War
Siege of Narva (1704), a battle between Sweden and Russia, part of the Great Northern War
Battle of Narva (1918), the starting event of the Estonian War of Independence between Estonia and Soviet Russia
Battle of Utria, between Estonian-Finnish forces and Soviet Russia January 1919
Battle of Krivasoo, between Estonia and Soviet Russia in November and December 1919
Battle of Narva (1944), between Nazi Germany and the Soviet Union, part of World War II